Lee Sang-Ha  (born April 19, 1985) is a South Korean football player who played for Home United F.C. in the S.League.

References

1985 births
Living people
South Korean footballers
South Korean expatriate footballers
Suwon Samsung Bluewings players
Home United FC players
K League 1 players
South Korean expatriate sportspeople in Singapore
Expatriate footballers in Singapore
Singapore Premier League players
Association football forwards